Michal Hašek (born 17 April 1976) is a Czech politician and former Governor of South Moravian Region. From 2002 until 2014, Hašek was a member of the Chamber of Deputies (MP). He also served as shadow Minister of Agriculture in the shadow cabinet of former Prime Minister Jiří Paroubek.

Career
Hašek is a graduate of the Faculty of Law of Masaryk University. He also has a juris degree, though its validity has been called into question as it was obtained at an obscure law school in the southwestern Slovakian town of Sládkovičovo. Furthermore, his thesis was led by Mojmír Mamojka, a friend of Hašek and a social democrat from Slovakia's Smer party, leading to allegations of clientelism.

In October 2013, shortly after the Czech legislative election, Hašek and his allies from ČSSD called on party Chairman Bohuslav Sobotka to resign following the party's poor election result and excluded him from the team negotiating the next government. However, it was subsequently revealed that Hašek and his allies had attended a secret post-election meeting with Czech President Miloš Zeman, and were alleged to have negotiated a "coup" in the ČSSD with him. Hašek had previously denied the accusations, stating on Czech Television that "there was no meeting". However, his allies, deputies Milan Chovanec, Zdeněk Škromach, Jeroným Tejc and Jiří Zimola, later admitted that the meeting took place. The event sparked public protests in the country and led to a public apology from Hašek, though he refused to resign.

Personal life
Hašek is married and has one daughter.

References

External links
 Homepage
 Chamber of Deputies profile

1976 births
Politicians from Brno
Living people
Czech Social Democratic Party MPs
Masaryk University alumni
Members of the Chamber of Deputies of the Czech Republic (2013–2017)
Members of the Chamber of Deputies of the Czech Republic (2010–2013)
Members of the Chamber of Deputies of the Czech Republic (2006–2010)
Members of the Chamber of Deputies of the Czech Republic (2002–2006)